Lago di Rascino is a lake karst mountain in the Province of Rieti, Lazio, Italy, in the territory of Fiamignano, in Cicolano.

At an elevation of 1146 m, its surface area is 0.283 km².

Description 
It is located at the edge of the homonymous large karst plateau, the plateau Rascino, along with other small bodies of water less seasonal. Not having tributaries, the reservoir collects rainwater and snow and the presence of karst sinkholes allows the outflow.

Flora and fauna 
Pike
Tench
Rudd
Carp
Perch
Carling

Lakes of Lazio